Hattah is a locality in Victoria, Australia located approximately 70 km south of Mildura. Located adjacent to Hattah is the Hattah-Kulkyne National Park.

Hattah had a Post Office for some months in 1903. Later when the railway arrived a Post Office again opened on 15 January 1915 known as Hattah R.S.(for Railway Station) until 1923. This office closed in 1974.

References

Towns in Victoria (Australia)
Mallee (Victoria)